This is a list of notable cookies (American English), also called biscuits (British English). Cookies are typically made with flour, egg, sugar, and some type of shortening such as butter or cooking oil, and baked into a small, flat shape.

Cookies

Unsorted 
 Lengua de gato
 Peanut butter blossom cookie
 Sandies
 Stuffed cookie

See also
 List of baked goods
 List of candies
 List of cookie sandwiches
 List of crackers
 List of desserts
 List of pastries
 List of shortbread biscuits and cookies

References

Cookies
Cookies